Fortitude is a British horror psychological thriller television series created and written by Simon Donald. A 12-episode season was commissioned by Sky Atlantic in 2013, and started airing on 29 January 2015. The series is set in the fictional Arctic Norwegian settlement of Fortitude. On 9 April 2015, Sky Atlantic recommissioned the show for a second season consisting of 10 episodes, which premiered on 26 January 2017. The third and final season premiered on 6 December 2018 and concluded on 27 December, consisting of 4 episodes.

Premise
On the Norwegian Arctic island of Fortitude, things appear calm on the surface, but a string of violent and increasingly strange deaths slowly exact a toll on the quiet international community where almost everyone appears to be keeping at least one secret.

Cast

Main cast

Recurring cast
 Tam Dean Burn as Billy Pettigrew (series 1, 3)

Series 1
 Chipo Chung as Trish Stoddart
 Darwin Brokenbro as Liam Sutter 
 Elizabeth Dormer-Phillips as Carrie Morgan 
 Michael Obiora as Max Cordero 
 Emil Hoștină as Yuri Lubimov 
 Jonjo O'Neill as Ciaran Donnelly
 Leanne Best as Celia Donnelly 
 Lorcan Cranitch as DI Bernard Littlejohn

Series 2
 Jude Akuwudike as Dr Adebimpe
 Gershwyn Eustache Jnr as Tomak Bowzyk 
 Rune Temte as Lars Ulvinaune 
 Eloise Smyth as Yeva Podnikov 
 David Yip as Hong Mankyo 
 Ralph Riach as Ralfi Sigurdson 
 Joi Johannsson as Axel Fersen
 Steve Toussaint as Avec Lamont 
 Mark Field as 'The Fiend'
 Jessica Henwick as Bianca Mankyo
Robert Sheehan as Vladek Klimov

Series 3
 Simon Donald as Neil McIndoe

Production

Conception
After talking to a parasitologist, writer Simon Donald based his parasite on ichneumon wasps, which lay their eggs in hosts.

Location
Fortitude is a fictional community located in Svalbard in Arctic Norway. It is described as an international community, with inhabitants from many parts of the world (population of 713 inhabitants and 4 police officers). The series was filmed in both the UK and Reyðarfjörður, Iceland.

Casting
American actor Stanley Tucci appears in his first British television role as Detective Chief Inspector Morton from London's Metropolitan Police, who has flown to the peaceful close-knit community of Fortitude as the local sheriff, played by Richard Dormer, investigates a violent murder. Christopher Eccleston plays Charlie Stoddart, a British scientist who leads the arctic biology department at the Fortitude arctic research facility. Michael Gambon portrays Henry Tyson, a wildlife photographer who is dying of cancer. The Killing star Sofie Gråbøl plays Hildur Odegard, the governor of Fortitude, in her first UK television drama role.

Episodes

Season 1 (2015)

Season 2 (2017)

Season 3 (2018)

Reception
The first season received positive reviews from critics. On Review aggregator Rotten Tomatoes, the first season has an 86% rating with an average score rating of 7.4 out of 10 based on 28 critic reviews. The critical consensus reads "Fortitudes fine cast, deliberate pacing, and chilling setting provide the show with more than enough of the titular quality." On Metacritic, the first season has a score of 75 out of 100, based on 15 critic reviews, which indicates "generally favorable reviews".

The second season received generally positive reviews. On Rotten Tomatoes, the season has an 88% approval rating with an average rating of 6.7 out of 10 based on 8 reviews.

International broadcast
In the United States and Canada, the series premiered on 29 January 2015 (the same date as the UK) on Pivot and Super Channel, respectively. It was also dubbed in Persian language and aired by Manoto. The series debuted in Australia on 15 February 2015 on ABC. Ale Kino+ HD started showing series 3 on 10 February 2019 dubbed in Polish, with original English audio also available.

Censorship
When FX broadcast the series in Indonesia on 19 February 2017, the violent scenes led to the banning of the channel by Indonesian authorities from 10 to 14 April 2017.

References

External links

2015 British television series debuts
2018 British television series endings
2010s British drama television series
2010s British horror television series
2010s British mystery television series
British horror fiction television series
English-language television shows
Sky Atlantic original programming
Svalbard in fiction
Television series by Banijay
Television series by Tiger Aspect Productions
Television shows set in the United Kingdom
Television shows set in the Arctic
Television shows set in Norway